Yugi Sethu is an Indian actor, filmmaker, writer, entrepreneur, television presenter, academician, critic and art historian who has worked in the Tamil film industry. An extremely versatile personality, he has been conferred doctorate (PhD) in cinema by the Madras University in July 2015, for his Thesis entitled: 'Development of a new box office predictability model'. He has appeared in a few films in main and supporting roles and has contributed to films as a screenwriter. He has hosted close to 1000 T.V. talk shows [Nayyandi Darbar, Sethuvudan Darbar, Yugiyudan Yugiyungal, etc...] and has been a jury since inception for popular "Star Vijay TV Movie Awards".

He is an academician, a critic, art historian, and is engaged in restoration and preservation of Tamil and other south Indian Vintage movies. He is now involved in ground work for spawning Independent movies in India.

Early life

He is a native of Oothukadu, Tamil Nadu, India. He completed a Bachelor of Commerce degree and finished post-graduate studies in political science.

He was awarded a gold medal during his time at the Film and Television Institute of Tamil Nadu for his student project film, The Rhetoric of the Continuity, which had the distinction of being the only Indian film selected among 45 other international entries at the 1984 International Film Festival of India in New Delhi and Music, courtesy of Satyajit Ray.

Career 

He wrote the Story for the Tamil box office hit K.S.Ravikumar's "Villain", starring Ajithkumar. He has acted in the lead in an Italian-English Telefilm, "Pidgin" (1995), which won an award at the Nanni Moretti's Sacher Film Festival in Rome [Regia: Andrea Gropplero, Interpreti: Yuhi Sethu & Anna Scaglione; Fotografia: Gianenrico Bianchi, Montaggio: Daniela Bassani]. He has acted in a cameo in the Iranian director Mohsen Makhmalbaf's, Scream of the Ants (2006) in Persian/English. He was the line producer for the French production of the docu-film "Kalaiyur" Directed by Sophie Martre. He has visited the Cannes Film festival several times since 1994 and has imported European films to India [Tales of Erotica;Katya Ismailova]. He distributed Shekar Kapur's "Bandit Queen" in Tamil Nadu state. He also trades in Film rights for Satellite TV, Home video, Internet and mobile.

Filmography

As actor

As screenwriter

As director/producer

References

Tamil film directors
Tamil-language film directors
Film directors from Chennai
Television personalities from Tamil Nadu
Living people
Film producers from Chennai
Screenwriters from Tamil Nadu
People from Thanjavur district
1964 births